Albert M. Stondall (August 4, 1865 – November 7, 1934) was an American businessman and politician.

Born in the town of Cottage Grove, Dane County, Wisconsin, Stondall went to Northwestern Business College. Stondall was a farmer and then became a real estate developer in Wisconsin in 1894. He was also in the lumber and banking businesses. From 1905 to 1907, Stondall served in the Wisconsin State Senate and was a Republican. Stondall died in a hospital in Madison, Wisconsin of a heart ailment.

Notes

1865 births
1934 deaths
People from Cottage Grove, Wisconsin
Madison Business College alumni
Businesspeople from Wisconsin
Farmers from Wisconsin
Republican Party Wisconsin state senators